Kenogami lake is a long lake in the Saguenay–Lac-Saint-Jean region of south-central Quebec, Canada. "Kénogami" means "long lake" in the Montagnais dialect and was originally used to refer to Kenogami Lake, Ontario.

The lake is fed by dozens of small rivers coming from the Laurentian Highlands. The three principal being the Pikauba, Cyriac and Aux-Ecorces Rivers.  The towns on its shores include Lac-Kénogami, and Hébertville station.

The area around the lake is served on the east side by route 175 (boulevard Talbot); on the north side by the Kénogami road, the Route des Bâtisseurs and the Saint-Dominique street in Jonquière. A few secondary roads have been built in the area for the needs of hydroelectricity, forestry, recreational tourism and residents of this area (especially the northern part of the lake).

Hydroelectricity is the main economic activity in this sector; recreational tourism activities, second; forestry, third.

The surface of Lake Kénogami is usually frozen from the beginning of December to the end of March, however the safe circulation on the ice is generally made from mid-December to mid-March.

Geography 

On its shores are the municipalities of Hébertville, Larouche and the former municipalities of Laterrière and Lac-Kénogami now part of the city of Saguenay.

The reservoir waters are retained by the dams Portage-des-Roches, Pibrac-Est and Pibrac-Ouest as well as the Ouiqui, Baie- dikes Cascouia, Moncouche, Coulée-Gagnon, Creek Outlet (1, 2 and 3) and Pibrac (East and West).

This lake has two outlets:
 Chicoutimi River (east side) whose entrance is bounded by the barrage de Portage-des-Roches;
 rivière aux Sables (north side) whose entrance is bounded by the Pibrac West dam.

The main characteristics (bays, points, islands) around the lake are (clockwise from the outlet Chicoutimi River):

South Shore
 Villa Marie bay,
 Moncouche bay (outlet of the Simoncouche River),
 the Pier-à-Chabot,
 Pointe aux Bouleaux,
 McDonald tip,
 McDonald Bay (receiving the McDonald Creek outlet),
 Cabland du Chaland bay,
 Finnigan point,
 Pointe du Caribou,

North Shore
 point Raphaël,
 points to Harvey,
 Epiphanes bay,
 Dufour bay,
 bay at Cadie,
 Pointe aux Sables,
 bay Gélinas,
 Chouinard Bay,
 Théophile bay

Épiphane Bay and Cascouia Bay
 bay at Simon's,
 Pointe de Sable,
 Camp lake,
 Clover Bay,
 bay to Richard,
 Lac à Jean bay
 Saint-Édouard Island,
 Dufour bay,
 Gagné bay,
 notch of the Curé,

Around Jean-Guy Island
 Green Island,
 Neighbor Bay,
 green island,
 Voisine Island.

Main buildings around the lake
 Saint-Cyriac Chapel
 Price retirees center

From the barrage de Portage-des-Roches, corresponding to the mouth of Lake Kénogami, the current follows the course of the Chicoutimi River on  towards the east, then the northeast and the course of the Saguenay River on  eastward to Tadoussac where it merges with the Saint Lawrence estuary.

Toponymy 
The toponym "Lac Kénogami" was formalized on December 5, 1968 at the Bank of Place Names of the Commission de toponymie du Québec.

See also

References 

Kenogami
Reservoirs in Quebec
Geography of Saguenay, Quebec